Laura Thompson may refer to:
Laura Thompson (journalist) (born 1979), Canadian journalist and musician
Laura Thompson (cyclist) (born 1987), New Zealand cyclist and former basketballer
Laura Thompson (politician), former Independent member of the Texas House of Representatives
 Laura Maud Thompson (1905-2000), American anthropologist